The Otematata River is a river in North Otago, New Zealand. It rises west of Kohurau and flows northward into Lake Aviemore east of Otematata township.

See also
List of rivers of New Zealand

References

Rivers of Otago
Rivers of New Zealand